This is a list of notable corruption scandals in Romania.

Investigations resulting in final sentences

Investigations resulting in convictions, subject to appeal

International scandals
 Dan Nica (Minister of Communications) was accused by the Thomas Lundin (Manager of Ericsson Romania) of having received a bribe from him in exchange for contracts for the 112 emergency systems. The accusations were made during an arbitration between Ericsson and Lundin in Sweden. The case is also under investigation by the U.S. Securities and Exchange Commission.

See also 
 Corruption in Romania
 List of Romanian politicians convicted of crimes
 Nu da șpagă, an anti-corruption campaign

References

 
Romania politics-related lists